The Dynamic Force engines are a family of petrol engine series developed by Toyota under the brand's New Global Architecture (TNGA) strategy. The engines were developed alongside the TNGA family of vehicle platforms, as part of a company-wide effort to simplify the vehicles being produced by Toyota.

The engine is used in various Toyota and Lexus models starting with the four-cylinder A25A type installed in XV70 series Camry in June 2017.



Overview 
The engine was developed as an engine that is claimed to achieve both driving performance and environmental performance while pursuing high efficiency and low fuel consumption as well as having a "direct feeling, smooth and pleasant acceleration performance".

Specifically, the cylinder head and intake port design improves the tumble flow (longitudinal vortex) to increase the air intake volume–the majority of intake flow is across that portion of the valve closest to cylinder centreline. Other methods include:
 Expansion of the valve clamping angle. The angle between intake and exhaust valve centreline is 41 degrees–the previous design was 31 degrees.
 Hydraulic variable valve timing on both intake and exhaust camshafts.
 Very high compression-moderated Atkinson cycle engine.
 Longer stroke to bore ratio (under-square design).
 Change of port end shape and expansion of seat inner diameter.
 Application of updated D-4S (multi-hole injector) system to achieve "high-speed combustion", resulting in thermal efficiency over 40%.
 Cylinder centreline is offset from crankshaft centreline, meaning that piston top dead center is always equivalent to several degrees of crankshaft rotation.

In development and production of the engine, Toyota claims it would be a "completely new engine design based on the TNGA strategy".

Previously, Toyota offered about 800 engine variants, most of which would be replaced with a much simpler lineup of 17 versions of nine Dynamic Force engines. Toyota is also simplifying its lineup of transmissions, hybrid systems, and all-wheel drive systems.

Starting with the four-cylinder A25A type installed in XV70 series Camry in June 2017, the V6 V35A and four-cylinder M20A types had also appeared. On 16 October 2019, the three-cylinder M15A type, which would be installed in the XP210 series Yaris (specifically designed for Japan, Europe, Australia, and New Zealand), was officially announced. On 12 June 2021, the first turbocharged four-cylinder model, named T24A, was introduced for the AZ20 series Lexus NX.

The Dynamic Force engines introduced an updated nomenclature system for Toyota engines and no longer employ the traditional iteration or generation of the engine followed by the one letter or two letter designation for the engine family (such as 5M-GE or 4GR-FE being from the M and GR engine families respectively) and instead incorporate the engine's displacement in between a two letter code such as the M20A, with the "20" denoting a 2.0-litre engine.

Common key technologies 

 High speed combustion technologies:
 Long stroke (stroke/bore ≒ 1.2)
 Wider angle between the intake and exhaust valve
 High efficiency intake port with laser cladded valve seat
 High compression ratio up to 14.0:1
 High energy ignition coil
 Updated D-4S system
 Multi-hole direct injector
 Variable cooling system:
 Motor driven water pump
 Heated thermostat
 Continuous variable-capacity oil pump
 Low viscosity engine oil
 Water jacket spacer
 Piston with laser pit skirt
 Drilled passage between cylinder bores
 VVT-iE
 Small-concave-profile camshaft
 Compact HLA
 High strength connecting rod
 High response intake air control
 Fuel injection control (multi-injection)
 Cylinder heads with built-in EGR cooler function
 Updated catalyst
 Change of exhaust manifold layout
 Piston oil jet control

M15 family 

The M15 engine family is a straight-three engine series that was first introduced in 2019 for the XP210 series Yaris.

M15A-FKS 
The standard version with 13.0:1 compression ratio achieves 40% thermal efficiency.

Applications (calendar years):
 2020–present Yaris (MXPA10/11/15)
 2020–present GR Yaris RS (MXPA12)
 2020–present Yaris Cross (MXPB10/15)
 2020–present Corolla (MZEA11/17)
 2022–present Sienta (MXPC10)

M15A-FXE 
The hybrid version with 14.0:1 compression ratio achieves 41% thermal efficiency.

Applications (calendar years):
 2020–present Yaris Hybrid/2022–present Mazda2 Hybrid (MXPH10/11/15)
 2020–present Yaris Cross Hybrid (MXPJ10/15)
 2021–present Aqua (MXPK10/11/15/16)
 2022–present Sienta Hybrid (MXPL10/15)

M15B-FKS 
Localized M15 series engine for China, manufactured by FTCE (FAW Toyota Changchun Engine Co., Ltd.).

Applications (calendar years):
 2021–present Corolla (MZEA11; China only)

M15C-FKS 
Localized M15 series engine for China, manufactured by GTE (Guangqi Toyota Engine Co., Ltd.).

Applications (calendar years):
 2021–present Levin (MZEA11)

M15D-FXE 
The hybrid version produced in Jigani, Bangalore, India by Toyota Industries Engine India (TIEI).

Applications (calendar years):

 2022–present Urban Cruiser Hyryder Hybrid/Suzuki Grand Vitara Hybrid

M20 family 

The M20 engine family is a straight-four engine series that was first introduced in 2018 for the E210 series Corolla.

M20A-FKS 
The standard version with 13.0:1 compression ratio achieves 40% thermal efficiency.

Applications (calendar years):
 2018–present Corolla/2018–2020 Auris (MZEA12)
 2018–present C-HR (MAXA10)
 2018–present RAV4 (MXAA52)
 2018–present Lexus UX 200 (MZAA10)
 2019–present Camry (MXVA71)
 2019–present Avalon (MXXA50)
 2020–present Lexus ES 200 (MXZA10)
 2020–present Harrier/2022–present Venza (MXUA80/85)
 2021–present Corolla Cross (MXGA10/15)
 2022–present Noah/Voxy/Suzuki Landy (MZRA90/95)
 2022–present Innova/Kijang Innova Zenix (MAGA10)

M20A-FKB 
The flex fuel E85 version with 13.0:1 compression ratio ethanol fuel capable.

Applications (calendar years):
 2020–present Corolla (MZEA12)
 2021–present Corolla Cross (MXGA10)

M20A-FXS 
The hybrid version with 14.0:1 compression ratio achieves 41% thermal efficiency.

Applications (calendar years):
 2018–present Corolla Hybrid (MZEH12)
 2018–present Lexus UX 250h/260h (MZAH10/15)
 2020–present C-HR Hybrid (MAXH10)
 2022–present Corolla Cross Hybrid (MXGH10/15)
 2022–present Prius (MXWH60/65)
 2022–present Innova Hybrid/Kijang Innova Zenix Hybrid (MAGH10)

M20B-FXS 
Version used only in China which is largely identical to the M20A-FXS engine, manufactured by FTCE (FAW Toyota Changchun Engine Co., Ltd.).

Applications (calendar years):
 2020–present IZOA Hybrid (MAXH10)

M20C-FKS 
Localized M20 series engine for China, manufactured by GTE (Guangqi Toyota Engine Co., Ltd.).

Applications (calendar years):
 2018–present C-HR (MAXA10; China only)
 2019–present Camry (MXVA71; China only)
 2020–present Wildlander (MXAA54)
 2021–present Venza (MXUA85; China only)
 2021–present Levin GT (MZEA12)
 2022–present Frontlander (MXGA15)

M20D-FKS 
Localized M20 series engine for China, manufactured by FTCE (FAW Toyota Changchun Engine Co., Ltd.).

Applications (calendar years):
 2018–present RAV4 (MXAA52; China only)
 2019–present Avalon (MXXA50; China only)
 2021–present Harrier (MXUA80; China only)

M20E-FKS 
Localized M20 series engine for China, manufactured by FTCE (FAW Toyota Changchun Engine Co., Ltd.).

Applications (calendar years):
 2018–present IZOA (MAXA10)
 2021–present Allion (MZEA12)
 2022–present Corolla Cross (MXGA10; China only)

M20F-FXS 
Version used only in China which is largely identical to the M20A-FXS engine, manufactured by GTE (Guangqi Toyota Engine Co., Ltd.).

Applications (calendar years):
 2020–present C-HR Hybrid (MAXH10; China only)

S20A 

The S20A engine is a straight-four engine series that was first introduced in 2022 for the Chinese market Highlander / Crown Kluger.

S20A-FTS 
The turbocharged version.

Applications (calendar years):
 2022–present Highlander / Crown Kluger (SXUA75)

A25 family 

The A25 engine family is a straight-four engine series that was first introduced in 2017 for the XV70 series Camry.

A25A-FKS 
The standard version with 13.0:1 compression ratio achieves 40% thermal efficiency.

Applications (calendar years):
 2017–present Camry (AXVA70/75)
 2018–present RAV4 (AXAA52/54)
 2018–present Lexus ES 250/260 (AXZA10/15)
 2018–present Avalon (AXXA50/55)
 2021–present Lexus NX 250/260 (AAZA20/25)

A25A-FKB 
Version used in Thailand with E85 ethanol fuel capable.

Applications (calendar years):
 2018–present Camry (AXVA70)

A25A-FXS 
The hybrid version with 14.0:1 compression ratio achieves 41% thermal efficiency.

Applications (calendar years):
 2017–present Camry Hybrid/Daihatsu Altis (AXVH70/75)
 2018–present Avalon Hybrid (AXXH50)
 2018–present RAV4 Hybrid (AXAH52/54)
 2018–present Lexus ES 300h (AXZH10/11)
 2018–2022 Crown Hybrid (AZSH20/21)
 2022–present Crown Crossover Hybrid (AZSH35)
 2019–present Highlander Hybrid/2021–present Kluger Hybrid (AXUH70/78)
 2020–present RAV4 Plug-in Hybrid/Prime/Suzuki Across (AXAP52/54)
 2020–present Harrier Hybrid/Venza (AXUH80/85)
 2022–present Harrier Plug-in Hybrid (AXUP80)
 2020–present Sienna/Granvia (AXLH40/45)
 2021–present Lexus NX 350h (AAZH20/25)
 2021–present Lexus NX 400h+/450h+ (AAZH26)
 2022–present Lexus RX 350h
 2022–present Lexus RX 450h+ (AALH16)
 2023–present Grand Highlander Hybrid

A25B-FXS 
This Engine are only used on Lexus Hybrid models in China, which the said engine is similar to the A25A-FXS engine used overseas.

Applications (calendar years):
 2018–present Lexus ES 300h (China) (AXZH10)
 2022–present Lexus NX 350h (China) (AAZH20)
 2022–present Lexus NX 400h+ (AAZH21)

A25C-FKS 
Version used only in China which is largely identical to the A25A-FKS engine, manufactured by GTE (Guangqi Toyota Engine Co., Ltd.).

Applications (calendar years):
 2018–present Camry (AXVA70; China only)
 2020–present Wildlander (AXAA54)
 2021–present Highlander (AXUA70; China only)

A25D-FXS 
Localized A25 series engine for China, manufactured by GTE (Guangqi Toyota Engine Co., Ltd.).

Applications (calendar years):
 2018–present Camry Hybrid (AXVH70; China only)
 2021–present Wildlander Hybrid (AXAH54)
 2021–present Wildlander Plug-in Hybrid (AXAP54)
 2021–present Highlander Hybrid (AXUH78)
 2021–present Sienna Hybrid (AXLH40)
 2022–present Venza Hybrid (AXUH85)

A25F-FXS 
Localized A25 series engine for China, manufactured by FTCE (FAW Toyota Changchun Engine Co., Ltd.).

Applications (calendar years):
 2021–present RAV4 Hybrid (AXAH52; China only)
 2021–present RAV4 Plug-in Hybrid (AXAP52; China only)
 2022–present Harrier Hybrid (AXUH80; China only)

A25G-FKS 
Version used only in China which is largely identical to the A25A-FKS engine, manufactured by FTCE (FAW Toyota Changchun Engine Co., Ltd.).

Applications (calendar years):
 2019–present Avalon (AXXA50; China only)
 2019–present RAV4 (AXAA52; China only)
 2021–present Crown Kluger (AXUA71)

A25H-FXS 
Localized A25 series engine for China, manufactured by FTCE (FAW Toyota Changchun Engine Co., Ltd.).

Applications (calendar years):
 2019–present Avalon Hybrid (AXXH50; China only)
 2021–present Crown Kluger Hybrid (AXUH79)
 2021–present Granvia Hybrid (AXLH40; China only)

T24A 

The T24A engine is a straight-four engine series that was first introduced in 2021 for the AZ20 series Lexus NX.

T24A-FTS 
The turbocharged version. A hybridised version (marketed as "Dual Boost Hybrid System" in Japan and "Hybrid Max" in North America) is also available with the same engine designation as the regular variant.

Applications (calendar years):
 2021–present Lexus NX 350 (TAZA25)
 2022–present Highlander/Kluger (TXUA70/75)
 2022–present Lexus RX 350 (TALA10/15)
 2022–present Lexus RX 500h (TALH17)
 2022–present Crown Crossover Turbo Hybrid (TZSH35)
 2023–present Grand Highlander
 2023–present Grand Highlander Turbo Hybrid

V35A 

The V35A engine is a V6 engine series that was first introduced in 2017 for the XF50 series Lexus LS. Despite its "35" nomenclature and being advertised as a 3.5-litre engine, its actual displacement is 3.4 litres (3,444 cc).

V35A-FTS 
The twin-turbocharged version with 10.5:1 compression ratio. Pumping losses have been reduced by electrification of the waste gate of the twin turbo system. The engine achieves 37% thermal efficiency. A hybridised version (marketed as "i-Force Max" in North America) is also available with the same engine designation as the regular variant.

The hybridised version was named Ward's World's 10 Best Engines list in 2022.

Applications (calendar years):
 2017–present Lexus LS 500 (VXFA50/55)
 2021–present Land Cruiser (VJA300)
 2021–present Tundra (VXKA70/71/72/75/76/77)
 2021–present Tundra Hybrid (VXKH70/71/75/76)
 2021–present Lexus LX 600 (VJA310)
 2022–present Sequoia Hybrid (VXKH80/85)

See also 
 Toyota F33A engine
 Toyota G16E engine
 List of Toyota engines

References